Paul Seiko Chihara (born July 9, 1938) is an American composer.

Life and career
Chihara was born in Seattle, Washington in 1938.  A Japanese American, he spent three years of his childhood with his family in an internment camp in Minidoka, Idaho due to Executive Order 9066.

Chihara received a BA and an MA in English literature from the University of Washington and Cornell University, respectively. He received a DMA in 1965 from Cornell, studying with Robert Palmer. He also studied composition with Nadia Boulanger in Paris, Ernst Pepping in West Berlin, and Gunther Schuller in Tanglewood.

He was the first composer-in-residence of the Los Angeles Chamber Orchestra, conducted by Neville Marriner, and was most recently part of the music faculty of UCLA, where he was the head of the Visual Media Program. , Chihara is on the faculty of New York University as an Artist Faculty in Film Music.

Music

Chihara's prize-winning concert works, which include symphonies, concertos, chamber music, choral compositions, and ballets, have been performed to great acclaim both nationally and internationally. His works are concerned with the evolution and expression of highly contrasting colors, textures, and emotional levels, which are often dramatically juxtaposed with one another.

His works have been commissioned by the Guggenheim Foundation, the Roger Wagner Chorale, the Naumberg Foundation, and the National Endowment for the Arts. He has also received commissions from the Boston Symphony Orchestra and the London Symphony, as well as the Los Angeles Philharmonic and Cleveland Orchestra. He was Composer-in-Residence with the San Francisco Ballet for ten years. Tempest and Shinju are among his well-known ballet scores.

His music reflects interest in a variety of musical styles, and often shows influence from Asian music and culture. He sometimes incorporates quotations and stylistic borrowings from jazz standards, folk songs, and the classical repertoire. He has composed music in a variety of forms, including ballets, musicals, symphonies, choral and chamber music.

His close connection with music for dramatic forms extends into film and television, for which he has written nearly 100 scores. His first film score was for Roger Corman's Death Race 2000 (1975), and came at a point that he decided to leave academia to pursue a living as a composer. His exit from the university environment, and into film music also produced a change in his concert music. It was at this point that he moved away from the 12-tone and freely chromatic styles he had employed up to then, and embraced a more tonal style.

He has worked with directors Sidney Lumet, Louis Malle, Michael Ritchie, and Arthur Penn. His film credits include Sweet Revenge (1976), I Never Promised You a Rose Garden (1977), The Bad News Bears Go to Japan (1978), A Fire in the Sky (1978), Prince of the City (1981), The Legend of Walks Far Woman (1982), The Survivors (1983), Crackers (1984), Impulse (1984), The Morning After (1986), Forever, Lulu (1987), The Killing Time (1987), Crossing Delancey (1988), and Penn & Teller Get Killed (1989). His television credits include The Dark Secret of Harvest Home, Dr. Strange, Brave New World, Noble House, Frederick Forsyth Presents (1989), and the pilot and theme music to Manimal, among others.

He also composed the score for Shōgun: The Musical, based on James Clavell's novel. Shōgun had a short run on Broadway, from November 1990 to January 1991.

Chihara's notable students include James Horner, Sean Friar, Joseph Trapanese, and Cynthia Tse Kimberlin.

Selected works

Concerto for viola and orchestra (1963)
Magnificat (1965)
Logs (double bass) (1966)
Driftwood (string quartet) (1967)
Branches (2 bassoons & percussion) (1968)
Redwood for viola and percussion (1968)
Prelude and Motet (Veni Domine) (organ) (1968)
Willow Willow (flute, tuba & percussion) (1968)
Forest Music (orchestra) (1970)
Windsong (cello & orchestra) (1971)
Ave Maria - Scarborough Fair (6 male voices) (1971)
Ceremony I (oboe, 2 celli, double bass & percussion) (1972)
Grass (double bass & orchestra) (1972)
Ceremony III (flute & orchestra) (1973) 
Ceremony IV (orchestra) (1973)
Ceremony II (amplified flute, 2 amplified celli & percussion) (1974)
Elegy (piano trio) (1974)
Piano Trio (1974)
Guitar Concerto (1975)
Symphony no.1 "Symphony in Celebration" (Ceremony V) (1975)
Shinju (Lovers’ Suicide) (ballet after Chikamatsu) (1975)
Missa Carminum (8 voices) (1975)
The Beauty of the Rose is in its Passing (bassoon, 2 horns, harp, & percussion) (1976)
String Quartet (Primavera) (1977)
Mistletoe Bride (1978)
The Infernal Machine revised as Oedipus Rag (musical after Jean Cocteau) (1978–80)
The Tempest (ballet, after Shakespeare) (1980)
Concerto for String Quartet & Orchestra ("Kisses Sweeter than Wine") (1980)
Sinfonia concertante (9 instruments) (1980)
Saxophone Concerto (1981)
Symphony no.2 "Birds of Sorrow" (1981)
Sequoia (string quartet & tape) (1984)
Noble House (1988)
Clarinet Trio (Shogun Trio) (1989)
Duo Concertante for violin and viola (1989)
Shogun: The Musical (1990)
Sonata "De Profundis" for viola and piano (1994, 2009)
Forever Escher (saxophone quartet & string quartet) (1995)
Minidoka (Reminiscences of ...) (ensemble & tape) (1996)
Minidoka (chorus, percussion & tape) (1998)
Double Concerto for Violin, Clarinet & Orchestra (1999)
Clouds (orchestra) (2001)
Songs of Love and Loss for solo viola and choir (2001)
Amatsu Kaze (soprano and five instruments) (2002)
An Afternoon on the Perfume River (chamber orchestra) (2004)
Trio Nostalgico (2004)
Magnificat: Hannah's Prayer (2007)
Fantasy (violin/flute, cello & piano) (2008)
Ami (piano, 4 hands) (2008)
When Soft Voices Die (viola & orchestra) (2008)
Images (clarinet, viola & piano) (2009)
Second Piano Quintet, "Aka Tombo (Dragonfly)" (2009)
Trouble in Tahiti (Suite) (2012), adaptation of Trouble in Tahiti, opera by Leonard Bernstein
''Ave Maria/Scarborough Fair" (double chorus and solo oboe) (2015) - Commissioned by the Los Angeles Master Chorale, Grant Gershon, Music Director

References

External links 

Interview with Paul Chihara at American Composers Orchestra

1938 births
21st-century American composers
21st-century American male musicians
American classical composers
American classical musicians of Japanese descent
American male classical composers
Classical musicians from Washington (state)
Cornell University alumni
Japanese-American internees
Living people
Musicians from Seattle
Varèse Sarabande Records artists